Kentucky Route 1005 (KY 1005) is an  long state highway in the U.S. state of Kentucky. The route is located in Shelby County and Franklin County.

Route description

The route originates at a junction with KY 43 near Shelbyville and travels east-northeast passing just south of Bagdad. Just east of Bagdad KY 1005 meets KY 43 in Consolation and heads southeastward into Franklin County. In Franklin County, the route continues to wind southeastward until it meets its southern terminus at U.S. 127 in Frankfort.

Major intersections

References

External links

 
 

1005
1005
1005